A point particle (ideal particle or point-like particle, often spelled pointlike particle) is an idealization of particles heavily used in physics. Its defining feature is that it lacks spatial extension; being dimensionless, it does not take up space. A point particle is an appropriate representation of any object whenever its size, shape, and structure are irrelevant in a given context. For example, from far enough away, any finite-size object will look and behave as a point-like object. Point masses and point charges, discussed below, are two common cases.  When a point particle has an additive property, such as mass or charge, it is often represented mathematically by a Dirac delta function.

In quantum mechanics, the concept of a point particle is complicated by the Heisenberg uncertainty principle, because even an elementary particle, with no internal structure, occupies a nonzero volume. For example, the atomic orbit of an electron in the hydrogen atom occupies a volume of ~10−30 m3. There is nevertheless a distinction between elementary particles such as electrons or quarks, which have no known internal structure, versus composite particles such as protons, which do have internal structure: A proton is made of three quarks.
Elementary particles are sometimes called "point particles" in reference to their lack of internal structure, but this is in a different sense than discussed above.

Point mass
Point mass (pointlike mass) is the concept, for example in classical physics, of a physical object (typically matter) that has nonzero mass, and yet explicitly and specifically is (or is being thought of or modeled as) infinitesimal (infinitely small) in its volume or linear dimensions.
In the theory of gravity, extended objects can behave as point-like even in their immediate vicinity.  For example, spherical objects interacting in 3-dimensional space whose interactions are described by the Newtonian gravitation behave in such a way as if all their matter were concentrated in their centers of mass. In fact, this is true for all fields described by an inverse square law.

Point charge

The fundamental equation of electrostatics is Coulomb's law, which describes the electric force between two point charges. Another result, Earnshaw's theorem, states that a collection of point charges cannot be maintained in a static equilibrium configuration solely by the electrostatic interaction of the charges. The electric field associated with a classical point charge increases to infinity as the distance from the point charge decreases towards zero, which suggests that the model is no longer accurate in this limit.

In quantum mechanics

In quantum mechanics, there is a distinction between an elementary particle (also called "point particle") and a composite particle. An elementary particle, such as an electron, quark, or photon, is a particle with no known internal structure. Whereas a composite particle, such as a proton or neutron, has an internal structure (see figure).
However, neither elementary nor composite particles are spatially localized, because of the Heisenberg uncertainty principle. The particle wavepacket always occupies a nonzero volume. For example, see atomic orbital: The electron is an elementary particle, but its quantum states form three-dimensional patterns.

Nevertheless, there is good reason that an elementary particle is often called a point particle. Even if an elementary particle has a delocalized wavepacket, the wavepacket can be represented as a quantum superposition of quantum states wherein the particle is exactly localized. Moreover, the interactions of the particle can be represented as a superposition of interactions of individual states which are localized.  This is not true for a composite particle, which can never be represented as a superposition of exactly-localized quantum states. It is in this sense that physicists can discuss the intrinsic "size" of a particle: The size of its internal structure, not the size of its wavepacket. The "size" of an elementary particle, in this sense, is exactly zero.

For example, for the electron, experimental evidence shows that the size of an electron is less than 10−18 m. This is consistent with the expected value of exactly zero. (This should not be confused with the classical electron radius, which, despite the name, is unrelated to the actual size of an electron.)

See also
 Test particle
 Elementary particle
 Brane
 Charge (physics) (general concept, not limited to electric charge)
 Standard Model of particle physics
Wave–particle duality

Notes and references

Notes

Bibliography

Further reading
 
 
 
 

Concepts in physics
Classical mechanics